Elections to Dover District Council in Kent, England were held on 3 May 2007. This was on the same day as other UK local elections. The whole council was up for election and the Conservative Party gained overall control of the council.

References

Dover District Council elections
2007 English local elections
2000s in Kent